The Tadas Ivanauskas Zoological Museum was established in Kaunas, Lithuania, in 1919 by Tadas Ivanauskas (1882–1970).

The museum collects and exhibits various animals: hunting trophies, stuffed animals, insect collections, skeletons, dissections. It is also an educational and research institution that has four branches: bird ringing stations in Ventė Cape and Juodkrantė, nature reserves in Čepkeliai Marsh and Lake Žuvintas.

References

External links

  

1919 establishments in Lithuania
Museums established in 1919
Zoology museums
Museums in Kaunas